Corky is a 1972 American drama film starring Robert Blake and directed by Leonard Horn.

Plot
Corky Curtiss is a Texas race-car mechanic obsessed with the sport. He is permitted to drive in local races on weekends, but boss Randy Dover replaces him with another driver because of his costly reckless ways.

With little money to support wife Peggy Jo and two kids, Corky needs his job but can't control his resentment. He enters a race on a figure-eight track and deliberately causes a crash that sends replacement driver Steve to the hospital. A furious Randy fires Corky from his mechanic's job.

Corky abandons his wife and heads for Georgia in his pink Plymouth Barracuda with a friend, Billy. He enters and wins a small race along the way, but drinks and gambles away the prize money at a roadhouse.

A sympathetic Randy realizes that Peggy Jo has been left with no money and prospects, so he gives her Corky's back wages plus a job. She also finds a second job and takes classes trying to earn a high-school diploma.

By the time Corky reaches Atlanta, he is almost dead broke and is not given a chance to drive at the speedway. Selling his tires, Corky picks a fight with a junkyard owner who sics attack dogs on him. He also insults passersby who offer assistance to his disabled vehicle. Billy objects to his behavior, then leaves with the strangers when Corky punches him.

Back home in Texas, penniless and despondent, Corky realizes that his wife has begun working for Randy and accuses her of having an affair. He goes to the garage with a gun and shoots a couple of Randy's mechanics. Trying to flee from police, the pink car bursts into flames with Corky inside. His last thoughts are fantasies of being a famous race driver.

Cast
 Robert Blake as Corky Curtiss
 Charlotte Rampling as Peggy Jo Curtiss
 Patrick O'Neal as Randy Dover
 Christopher Connelly as Billy
 Pamela Payton-Wright as Rhonda
 Ben Johnson as Boland
 Laurence Luckinbill as Wayne Nesbitt
 Paul Stevens as Tobin Hayes
 Bobby Allison as himself
 Donnie Allison as himself
 Buddy Baker as himself
 Richard Petty as himself
 Cale Yarborough as himself
 Charlie Briggs as Red
 Jack Garner as Driver
 Lulu Roman as Sue
 John Marriott as Junkman
 Glen Wood as himself

Production
Producer Bruce Geller was so upset at post-production changes made to the film by MGM management that he asked for his name to be taken off the film. This was refused.

See also
 List of American films of 1972

References

External links 

1972 films
American auto racing films
Films set in the 1970s
1972 drama films
Metro-Goldwyn-Mayer films
American drama films
Films scored by Jerry Styner
Films directed by Leonard Horn
1970s English-language films
1970s American films